Scott Fields (born April 22, 1973) is a former American football linebacker who played for the Atlanta Falcons and Seattle Seahawks of the National Football League (NFL). He played college football at University of Southern California.

References 

1973 births
Living people
People from Ontario, California
Players of American football from California
American football linebackers
USC Trojans football players
Atlanta Falcons players
London Monarchs players
Berlin Thunder players
Seattle Seahawks players
Sportspeople from San Bernardino County, California
Los Angeles Xtreme players